Mohamed El-Sayed (born 1905, date of death unknown) was an Egyptian middle-distance runner. He competed in the men's 1500 metres at the 1924 Summer Olympics.

References

External links
 

1905 births
Year of death missing
Athletes (track and field) at the 1924 Summer Olympics
Egyptian male middle-distance runners
Egyptian male long-distance runners
Olympic athletes of Egypt
Place of birth missing